Ek Akasher Niche is a Family Drama Bengali television serial, which aired on Alpha Bangla. It was produced under the banner of Ravi Ojha Productions.

Cast
Sumitra Mukherjee / Soma Dey as Amma.
Gita Dey as Amma's Thammi
Partha Sarathi Deb / Arindam Sil as Ajoy
Chaiti Ghoshal as Madhabi
Rajatava Dutta as Atul
Sudipa Basu / Indrani Basu as Anita
Saswata Chatterjee as Akash
Rumni Sengupta / Aditi Chatterjee / Debolina Dutta as Nandini: Akash's wife
Rita Dutta Chakraborty as Raj
Kunal Mitra as Aniket
Rupanjana Mitra as Mohini
Aparajita Auddy as Minu
Badshah Maitra as Bhaskar / Palash
Debidas Bhattacharyya as Singer Shubhankar
Aritra Dutta as Ani, Meenu's son
Kamalika Banerjee as Chutki 
Shantilal Mukherjee as Saibal
Kalyan Chatterjee as Kanai
Rumki Chatterjee as Toru
Koneenica Banerjee as Pakhi
Samata Das as Tuski
Swastika Mukherjee as Piu
Bhaswar Chatterjee as Indra
Parambrata Chattopadhyay as Shayan
Abir Chatterjee as Rangan
Monami Ghosh as Zeenat
Kharaj Mukherjee as Dr. Rajat Ganguly
Baishakhi Marjit as Dr. Oildrila Sarkar
Tulika Basu as Elora Sarkar
Sourabh Das as Elora's son
Koushik Sen as Rittik
Sunita Sengupta as Julia
Chitra Sen as Julia's Thammi
Pushpita Mukherjee as Dr. Mallika Basu
Mithu Chakrabarty
Arunima Ghosh as Smita
Soma Banerjee as Manashi
Chaitali Chakrabarty
Rita Koiral as Moli
Dipankar Dey
Rana Mitra
Ardhendu Banerjee
Debshankar Haldar as Palash's brother
Rudranil Ghosh as Probal
Gouri Sankar Panda as Saibal's father
Chhanda Karanjee Chatterjee as Saibal's mother
Alokananda Roy as Nandini's Mother
Dwijen Bandopadhyay as Bhaskar's Father
Urmimala Basu as Bhaskar's Mother
Tamal Roy Choudhury as Public Procecutor
Nandini Ghoshal as Indira
Biplab Bandopadhyay as Joy
Milan Roy Choudhury as Dibyendu
Meghna Halder as Rupa
Papiya Sen as Rupa's Mother
Moumita Gupta as Indra's Mother
Sudip Mukherjee as Sisir, Saibal's Cousin Brother

References

Indian television soap operas
Bengali-language television programming in India
Zee Bangla original programming